Conologue is an unincorporated community in Jackson County, Indiana, in the United States.

A post office was established at Conologue in 1866, and remained in operation until it was discontinued in 1876.

References

Unincorporated communities in Jackson County, Indiana
Unincorporated communities in Indiana